Kevin Goh Wei Ming (born 7 July 1983) is a chess player from Singapore. He is a seven-time Singaporean champion (2006, 2007, 2008, 2009, 2012, 2013 and 2017) and has represented Singapore in the Chess Olympiad since 2004.

In 2000 he won the boys under 18 section at the 1st ASEAN Age Group Chess Championships in Vũng Tàu, Vietnam. At the 2005 Southeast Asian Games, Goh won two bronze medals, in the men's standard individual event and in the teams' one. In 2010 he played in Singapore the first game of an exhibition blitz match between top Singaporean players and Garry Kasparov. In March 2011, in Hungary, he won back to back the First Saturday GM tournament in Budapest and the Caissa GM tournament in Kecskemét; in this latter he achieved his first norm required for the title of Grandmaster. The next year, Goh gained his second norm at the Asian Nations Cup in Zaozhuang, China, where he played for team Singapore. In 2018, he finished second, behind Tsegmed Batchuluun, in the QCD-Prof Lim Kok Ann Grandmasters Invitational tournament, held in Singapore, also achieving his third and final grandmaster norm. Goh was awarded the title of Grandmaster by FIDE in 2020, when his Elo rating exceeded 2500.

Books

References

External links
 
 
 ChessBase.com - Chess News - Goh Weiming Ready for war over the board
 IM Kevin Goh's Chess Site

1983 births
Living people
Chess grandmasters
Chess Olympiad competitors
Chess writers
Singaporean chess players
Singaporean sportspeople of Chinese descent
Southeast Asian Games bronze medalists for Singapore
Southeast Asian Games medalists in chess
Competitors at the 2005 Southeast Asian Games
21st-century Singaporean people